Claudette Powell (born 24 October 1952) is a Bahamian sprinter. She competed in the women's 100 metres at the 1972 Summer Olympics. She was the first woman to represent the Bahamas at the Olympics.

References

1952 births
Living people
Athletes (track and field) at the 1972 Summer Olympics
Bahamian female sprinters
Olympic athletes of the Bahamas
Athletes (track and field) at the 1970 British Commonwealth Games
Athletes (track and field) at the 1971 Pan American Games
Commonwealth Games competitors for the Bahamas
Place of birth missing (living people)
Pan American Games competitors for the Bahamas
Olympic female sprinters